Boronia spathulata is a plant in the citrus family, Rutaceae and is endemic to the south-west of Western Australia. It is a glabrous shrub with well-spaced, simple, egg-shaped to elliptic leaves, and pink, four-petalled flowers.

Description
Leaves near the ends of the branchlets are usually more or less cylindrical. The flowers are arranged in cymes that have a short peduncle, the individual flowers on a red pedicel that has small bracts at its base. The eight stamens are hairy with a small white tip on the anther and the stigma is only slightly larger than the style. Flowers are present in most months.<ref name="ABRS">{{cite web |last1=Duretto |first1=Marco F. |last2=Wilson |first2=Paul G. |last3=Ladiges |first3=Pauline Y. |title=Boronia spathulata |url=https://profiles.ala.org.au/opus/foa/profile/Boronia%20spathulata |publisher=Flora of Australia: Australian Biological Resources Study, Department of the Environment and Energy, Canberra |accessdate=1 May 2019}}</ref>

Taxonomy and namingBoronia spathulata was first formally described in 1839 by John Lindley and the description was published in A Sketch of the Vegetation of the Swan River Colony. The specific epithet (spathulata) is derived from the Latin word spathe meaning "any broad blade, paddle for stirring and mixing".

Distribution and habitat
This boronia grows in sand near swamps or rivers and in jarrah forest. It occurs between Perth and Augusta and east to Israelite Bay.

ConservationBoronia spathulata'' is classified as "not threatened" by the Western Australian Government Department of Parks and Wildlife.

References

spathulata
Flora of Western Australia
Plants described in 1839
Taxa named by John Lindley